Terra Nova High School may refer to:

 Terra Nova High School (Oregon) in Portland, Oregon
 Terra Nova High School (California) in Pacifica, California